This is a list of recipients of the Air Force Medal of Australia.

Royal Air Force
 Flight Lt. Albert (Bert) Welvaert 1917-2014
 Sergt.-Pilot Clifford Hare 45733 1919
 Flt. Sgt. Alister Bruce Fraser 1674909 1953
 Flt. Lt. Dominic Bruce 1915-2000 (only man to be awarded the AFM and the Military Cross)

Queens Birthday Honours 26 May 1953
Flight sergeants:
 1590837 Benjamin Roy BRADLEY, Royal Air Force
 575765 James DOUGAN, Royal Air Force.
 517971- Alfred John FAIRBAIRN, Royal Air Force.
 794418 Kazimierz GORNY, Royal Air Force.
 1584832 Terence Maxwell HAMER, Royal Air Force.
 1331420 (now Master Signaller) William
 Frederick Joseph HFLLS, Royal Air Force.
 578431 Austen Brian HOWES, Royal Air Force.
 1215791 Thomas McHuGH, D.F.C., Royal Air Force.
 1801364 Alexander Henry SHELTON, Royal Air Force.
 1287688 Henry Frederick John THORPE, Royal Air Force.

Sergeants:
 4030743 Zivan ATANACKOVIG, Royal Air Force.
 1583805 Richard Eric BOWLER, Royal Air Force.
 1436951 Geoffrey Ashwell HALL, Royal Air Force.
 1816311 William Sidney JONES, Royal Air Force.
 2236572 John Patrick MCCARTHY, Royal Air Force.
 1180724 Daniel Victor SUTTON, Royal Air Force.
 1809968 Richard Thomas VANE, Royal Air Force.

Royal Australian Air Force

References

 
Australian awards
Royal Australian Air Force